The Kensington Lakes Activities Association (KLAA) is an athletic conference for high schools in Michigan. It was formed in the 2008-2009 school year as a result of the merger of the Kensington Valley Conference and the Western Lakes Activities Association, plus two other schools joining from the Oakland Activities Association and the newly built South Lyon East.  The league started in 2008 with 23 teams. Howell Parker was to join the KLAA when the conference was first created, but closed after only one year of operation and later re-opened as a middle school. Grand Blanc joined in 2009 to give the league 24 teams.

Member schools

Current members

Former members

Membership timeline

On March 13, 2017, Milford, South Lyon, South Lyon East, Walled Lake Central, Walled Lake Northern, Walled Lake Western, Waterford Kettering, Waterford Mott, and White Lake Lakeland announced plans to leave the KLAA to form a new conference entitled the Lakes Valley Conference, effective starting the 2017-2018 school year. Pinckney also left the KLAA in 2017 to join the Southeastern Conference. These departures prompted the KLAA to switch from a four division system of North, South, West, and Central divisions to a two division system of Black and Gold divisions, and later, East and West divisions.

The next day, on March 14, 2017, Grand Blanc was voted out of the KLAA effective for the 2018-2019 school year (due to how isolated it is from the other schools in the division) where it proceeded to join the Saginaw Valley League. In its place, Belleville, Dearborn, and Dearborn Fordson joined the KLAA in 2018.

References

External links
KLAASports.org - official site
KLAAStandings.com - KLAA Sports Standings

Michigan high school sports conferences
High school sports conferences and leagues in the United States
2008 establishments in Michigan